The Greville Arms Hotel is a luxury hotel located in the centre of Mullingar, Ireland. In 1868, Lord Greville leased a right of way to the War Minister for 10,000,000 years – the longest lease in the world. In 1858, Lord Greville had purchased the town, and his family remained landlords until the 1920s. The hotel, which was Lord Greville's home, was built circa 1869.  The Greville Arms Hotel in Mullingar is one of the few surviving Irish hotels known to James Joyce and mentioned by him in his writings.

History
The hotel is built on the site of an earlier Greville Arms Hotel, in existence in 1750. The interior retains an interesting monument known as the Greville Monument, which is now located in the hotel's roof-top garden. Caldbeck was Lord Greville's architect of choice, and he was also responsible for the building of the Market House. Located to the right of the hotel is the Ulysses pub, which is named after Joyce's novel, and a statue of Joyce is within the public house to commemorate his stay in Mullingar. The Ulysses pub was originally built as a house circa 1820.

References

Hotels in County Westmeath
Buildings and structures in Mullingar